Patrol Boat is an Australian television drama series that screened on the Australian Broadcasting Corporation. Patrol Boat was created by James Davern and two series were produced, in 1979 and 1983, with a total of 26 episodes.

Patrol Boat was about the activities of the crew of a Royal Australian Navy patrol boat which patrolled Australia's coastline. The series was produced with the co-operation of the Royal Australian Navy.

Two fictional RAN patrol boats were depicted in the series. HMAS Ambush (portrayed by HMA Ships  and ) was used in the first season, with filming taking place during 1978 and 1979 around Sydney Harbour, Pittwater, Ku-ring-gai Chase, and the Hawkesbury River.

The series is similar to the BBC series Warship, screened by the Australian Broadcasting Corporation from 1976. This was before Patrol Boat which was influenced by Warship. Although the 2007 drama Sea Patrol is based on the same subject, it is not intended to be a follow on to Patrol Boat.

Cast
 Andrew McFarlane as Lieutenant David Keating
 Robert Coleby as Lieutenant Charles Fisher, called "X" for executive officer
 Danny Adcock as Petty Officer "Buffer" Johnston
 Tim Burns as Able Seaman "Chef" McKinnon
 Robert Baxter as Petty Officer "Swain" Reynolds
 Mervyn Drake as Petty Officer Peter Brown
 Grant Dodwell as Bluey
 Margo Lee as Matron Whylie
 Alan David Lee as Walshy
 Zoe Bertram
 Janet Andrewartha
 Philip Parnell as Radio Operator "Nobby" Clarke

Episode list
Season 1: 1979
#"We Lie in Wait" 28 June 1979
#"Rogue Mine" 5 July 1979
#"Fish-Heads and Birdies" 19 July 1979
#"Another Bunch of Reffos" 26 July 1979
#"Follow the Leader" 2 August 1979
#"My Dad's a Sailor" 9 August 1979
#"Conduct Prejudicial" 16 August 1979
#"Don't Call Me Borgia" 23 August 1979
#"Incident at Mencken Bay" 30 August 1979
#"Which Way's Mecca?" 6 September 1979
#"The Enemy You Know" 13 September 1979
#"Man Overboard" 20 September 1979
#"Never Under the White Ensign" 27 September 1979
 
Season 2: 1983
#"Something Old, Something New" 19 May 1983
#"Tango Victor" 26 May 1983
#"Nice Day For a Cruise" 2 June 1983
#"Hands to Bathe" 9 June 1983
#"Cold Turkey" 16 June 1983
#"Spoils of War" 23 June 1983
#"All the Nice Girls" 30 June 1983
#"Make and Mend" 7 July 1983
#"Operation Christmas" 14 July 1983
#"The Albatross" 21 July 1983
#"Par for the Course" 28 July 1983
#"A Skunk on the Radar" 4 August 1983
#"Beggarman Thief" 11 August 1983

References

External links
 Media clip of show introduction and theme from ABC Television
 Patrol Boat at the National Film and Sound Archive
 Patrol Boat Pictures – Andrew McFarlane Fansite
 

Australian Broadcasting Corporation original programming
Australian drama television series
Television shows set in Queensland
1979 Australian television series debuts
1983 Australian television series endings
Australian military television series